Rick Wallace (born February 12, 1948) is an American film director and television producer. He has worked on Smallville, L.A. Law, Doogie Howser, M.D. and The Closer, as well as many other programs.

Partial filmography

Director
The Closer
Women's Murder Club
Men in Trees (2006)
Commander in Chief (2005)
Law & Order: Special Victims Unit (2003)
Smallville (2001)
NYPD Blue
Las Vegas
L.A. Law (1990)
Doogie Howser, M.D.
City of Angels
Medical Investigation
Law & Order
Philly
Bay City Blues
Karen Sisco
Ed
Murder One
Martial Law
Law & Order: Criminal Intent
Beggars and Choosers
The Pretender
Early Edition
Nash Bridges
Fantasy Island
Hill Street Blues

Producer
 Major Crimes (2012-2015)
 The Closer (2005-2012)
 Men in Trees (2006)
 The Pretender (1996)
 Doogie Howser, M.D. (1989)
 L.A. Law (1988–1993)

External links

American television directors
American television producers
1948 births
Living people